Immunity from prosecution is a doctrine of international law that allows an accused to avoid prosecution for criminal offences.  Immunities are of two types.  The first is functional immunity, or immunity ratione materiae.  This is an immunity granted to people who perform certain functions of state. The second is personal immunity, or immunity ratione personae.  This is an immunity granted to certain officials because of the office they hold, rather than in relation to the act they have committed.

Functional immunity 
Functional immunity arises from customary international law and treaty law and confers immunities on those performing acts of state (usually a foreign official). Any person who, in performing an act of state, commits a criminal offence is immune from prosecution. That is so even after the person ceases to perform acts of state.  Thus, it is a type of immunity limited in the acts to which it attaches (acts of state) but ends only if the state itself ceases to exist. The immunity, though applied to the acts of individuals, is an attribute of a state, and it is based on the mutual respect of states for sovereign equality and state dignity. States thus have a significant interest in upholding the principle in international affairs: if a state's officials are to be tried at all for anything, it will be at home.

State offices usually recognised as automatically attracting the immunity are the head of state or the head of government, senior cabinet members, ambassadors and the foreign and defence ministers. Many countries have embodied the immunities in domestic law.

States regularly assert that every official acting in an official capacity is immune from prosecution by foreign authorities (for non-international crimes) under the doctrine of ratione materiae. Such officers are immune from prosecution for everything they do during their time in office. For example, an English court held that a warrant could not be issued for the arrest of Robert Mugabe on charges of international crimes on the basis that he was serving as head of state at the time that the proceedings were brought. Other examples are the attempts to prosecute Fidel Castro in Spain and Jiang Zemin in the US.

However, once the accused leave their offices, they are immediately liable to be prosecuted for crimes committed before or after their term in office, or for crimes committed in a personal capacity whilst in office (subject to jurisdictional requirements and local law).

It may be the case that functional immunity is itself being eroded. Recent developments in international law suggest that ratione materiae may remain available as a defence to prosecution for local or domestic crimes or civil liability, but it is not a defence to an international crime. (International crimes include crimes against humanity, war crimes, and genocide.)

The indictment in 1998 in Spain (and subsequent arrest in the UK) of Chile's Pinochet was a landmark decision by European judges and the UK's House of Lords, which set aside functional as well as local immunities, by ruling that the crimes Pinochet was accused of fell within the scope of the United Nations Convention against Torture, being international crimes so heinous that they are:

 subject to universal jurisdiction (i.e. he could validly be indicted in Spain, held in custody in the UK on foot of an international arrest warrant and then extradited to Spain for trial, for acts that were committed mainly in Chile on the nationals of several countries);
 absolutely prohibited (there can be no exceptions whatever to the prohibitions); and
 responsibility cannot be derogated (no excuses whatsoever or immunity under any circumstances).

The principle of depriving immunity for international crimes was developed further in the jurisprudence of the International Criminal Tribunal for the Former Yugoslavia, particularly in the Karadzic, Milosevic, and Furundzija cases (but care should be taken when considering ICTY jurisprudence due to its ad-hoc nature).  This was also the agreed position as between the parties in their pleadings in the International Court of Justice case concerning the arrest warrant of 11 April 2000 (Democratic Republic of the Congo v. Belgium).

In 2004 the Appeals Chamber of the Special Court for Sierra Leone held that indicted Liberian president Charles Taylor could not invoke his head of state immunity to resist the charges against him, even though he was an incumbent head of state at the time of his indictment. However, this reasoning was based on the construction of the court's constituent statute, that dealt with the matter of indicting state officials. In any case, Taylor had ceased to be an incumbent head of state by the time of the court's decision so the arresting authorities would have been free to issue a fresh warrant had the initial warrant been overturned. Nevertheless, this decision may signal a changing direction in international law on this issue.

It is worth noting that the decisions of the Spanish and UK courts in relation to Pinochet were based directly on existing domestic law, which had been enacted to embody the obligations of the treaty. Although a state party to the treaty, Chile itself had not enacted such laws, which define the specified international crimes as crimes falling within the domestic criminal code and making them subject to universal jurisdiction, and thus Chile could only prosecute on the basis of its existing criminal code – murder, abduction, assault etc., but not genocide or torture.

The reasons commonly given for why this immunity is not available as a defence to international crimes is straight forward:
 that genocide, war crimes and crimes against humanity are not acts of state.  Criminal acts of the type in question are committed by human actors, not states; and
 we cannot allow the jus cogens nature of international crimes, i.e. the fact that they are non-derogable norms, to be eroded by immunities.

However, the final judgment of the ICJ regarding immunity may have thrown the existence of such a rule limiting functional immunities into doubt. See in this respect the criticism of the ICJ's approach by Wouters, Cassese and Wirth among others, though some such as Bassiouni claim that the ICJ affirmed the existence of the rule.

Regarding claims based on the idea that a senior state official committing International crimes can never be said to be acting officially, as Wouters notes: "This argument, however, is not waterproof since it ignores the sad reality that in most cases those crimes are precisely committed by or with the support of high-ranking officials as part of a state’s policy, and thus can fall within the scope of official acts." Academic opinion on the matter is divided and indeed only the future development of International Customary law, possibly accelerated by states exercising universal jurisdiction over retired senior state officials, will be able to confirm whether state sovereignty has now yielded partially to internationally held human rights values.

In November 2007, French prosecutors refused to press charges against former US Secretary of Defense Donald Rumsfeld for torture and other alleged crimes committed during the course of the US invasion of Iraq, on the grounds that heads of state, heads of government and foreign ministers all enjoyed official immunity under customary international law, and they further claimed that the immunity exists after the official has left office. However, other jurists hold that heads of state and state officials still can be prosecuted by foreign courts after the end of their terms of office.

Personal immunity 

Personal immunity arises from customary international law and confers immunity on people holding a particular office from the civil, criminal, and administrative jurisdiction. It is extended to diplomatic agents and their families posted abroad and is also valid for their transfer to or from that post, only for the country to which they are posted. Under personal immunity, private residence, papers, correspondence, and property of an official enjoying personal immunities are inviolable.

According to Cassese (2005), personal immunities are extended to cover personal activities of an official, including immunity from arrest and detention (but the host state may declare the person persona non grata), immunity from criminal jurisdiction, immunity from the civil and administrative jurisdiction of the host state. No immunities hold for private immoveable property unless it is held on behalf of the sending state for the purposes of the mission, issues of succession, professional or commercial activity exercised outside of official functions, or the official has voluntarily submitted to the proceedings. Personal immunities cease with the cessation of the post.

It is not for the official's personal benefit but is based on the need for states to function effectively and thus not be deprived of their most important officials.

Cases of overlap 
When a person leaves office who is under a personal immunity and has committed a criminal act covered also by functional immunity, the personal immunity is removed, as usual.

That is what happened in the Augusto Pinochet case before the House of Lords. Senator Pinochet was able to be extradited to face only charges not under functional immunity and meeting the separate tests for extradition, under English law.

Footnotes

See also 
Amnesty law
Command responsibility
Diplomatic immunity
Extradition
International law
Jurisdiction
State immunity

References

Cases
  In Re Pinochet (1999) 93 AJIL 690
  R v Bow Street Metropolitan Stipendiary Magistrate, ex parte Pinochet (Nos 1 & 3), [2000] 1 AC 147
  Arrest Warrant of 11 April 2000 case (Democratic Republic of the Congo v Belgium), ICJ Rep, 2002

Commentary
  Akande, “International Law Immunities and the International Criminal Court”, (2004) 98 AJIL 407
  Cassese, International Criminal Law (OUP, Oxford 2003), Chapter 14
  Cassese, “When May Senior State Officials be Tried for International Crimes? Some Comments on the Congo v. Belgium Case”, (2002) 13 EJIL 853
  Fox, The Law of State Immunity, (OUP, Oxford 2003), Chapter 12
  Warbrick, “Immunity and International Crimes in English Law”, (2004) 53 ICLQ 769

External links

International criminal law
Legal immunity
Diplomatic immunity and protection